This is the family tree of the House of Frankopan (Counts of Krk, Senj and Modruš), a Croatian noble family, from 1115 to 1671.

See also 
 House of Frankopan
 List of rulers of Croatia
 Šubić family tree
 Zrinski family tree
 Frangipani family

References

Sources

External links 
 
 The members of the family in the book „Episcopi Veglienses“ („Bishops of Krk“) written by Daniele Farlati /in Latin/
 Frankopans, princes of Krk 1115-1480 (Author: Damir Tulić, Ph.D., Faculty of Philosophy, University of Rijeka /in Croatian/)
 Stjepan III Frankopan, Ban (Viceroy) of Croatia and a confidant of king Sigismund of Luxemburg – text from the Institute „Ruđer Bošković“ in Zagreb (Author: Petar Strčić, academician)
 Nikola IX Frankopan Tržački, Ban (Viceroy) of Croatia 1617-1622 – text from the Croatian Lexicographic institute „Miroslav Krleža“ in Zagreb
 Brothers Vuk and Nikola Frankopan took part in the 1615-1617 Uskok War /in Italian/
 Vinodol as well as Novi Vinodolski were property of the Princes of Krk (later renamed Frankopan) since 1225 - text from the Historical Miscellany of the Croatian Historical Society, Zagreb, 1964 Edition (Author: Prof. Vladimir Košćak) /in Croatian/

Further reading
For the descendants of the Counts Frangipani or Frankopanovich or Francopanovich or Francopanovits of Dalmatia Croatia see:
 Famiglia Frangipane or Frangipani wikipedia voice (italian): [https://it.wikipedia.org/wiki/Frangipane_(famiglia)
 Friederich Heyer von Rosenfield (1873), "Counts Frangipani or Frankopanovich or Damiani di Vergada Gliubavaz Frangipani (Frankopan) Detrico", in: Wappenbuch: Der Adel des Königreichs Dalmatien, Volume 4, part 3 (in German). Nürnberg: Bauer und Raspe, p. 44.
 Friederich Heyer von Rosenfield (1873), "Counts Frangipani or Frankopanovich or Damiani di Vergada Gliubavaz Frangipani (Frankopan) Detrico", in: Wappenbuch: Der Adel des Königreichs Dalmatien, Volume 4, part 3 (in German). Nürnberg: Bauer und Raspe, p. 45.
 Friederich Heyer von Rosenfield (1873), "Coats of arms of Counts Frangipani or Frankopanovich or Damiani di Vergada Gliubavaz Frangipani (Frankopan) Detrico", in: Wappenbuch: Der Adel des Königreichs Dalmatien, Volume 4, part 3 (in German). Nürnberg: Bauer und Raspe, taf. 30.
 J. B. Rietstap (1884), "Coats of arms of Counts Frangipani or Gliubavaz Frangipani or Gliubavaz Frangipani Detrico or Damiani di Vergaada Gliubavaz Frangipani Detrico", in:  (in France). Gouda: G. B. vaan Goor Zonen, pp.703-704, p.786, p.507.
 Victor Anton Duisin (1938), "Counts Damjanić Vrgadski Frankopan Ljubavac Detrico", in: "Zbornik Plemstva" (in Croatian). Zagreb: Tisak Djela i Grbova, p. 155-156. 
 "Counts Damjanić Vrgadski Frankopan Ljubavac Detrico" in: (in Croatian). Zagreb: on line.
 

Family trees